James Speare (born 5 November 1976) is an English former footballer who played as a goalkeeper.

Career

Having left Everton as a trainee in 1997, Speare joined Darlington making two appearances in the 1996–97 season. He then moved over to Ireland and joined Sligo Rovers.

Following a move to then non-league side Accrington Stanley in 1998, Speare played in almost 300 games over a 6-year period until the summer of 2004.

Speare has since appeared for a number of lower league clubs including Southport,  Lancaster City and Barrow amongst others.

Following a goalkeeper injury crisis at Accrington Stanley in the winter of 2008 Speare re-joined the club on a short-term contract, despite not making an appearance he was a regular on the substitutes bench until his release in January 2009.

In November 2011 following an injury to Ian Dunbavin Speare re-joined the club for a third time on another short-term deal, making the substitutes bench again on 12 November 2011 in a 1st Round FA Cup tie against Notts County.

On 12 October 2013, Jamie joined Cammell Laird as a goalkeeping coach. In October 2014 he followed manager Tony Sullivan to Witton Albion.

References

External links

1976 births
Footballers from Liverpool
Living people
Association football goalkeepers
English footballers
English expatriate footballers
Everton F.C. players
Colwyn Bay F.C. players
Darlington F.C. players
Sligo Rovers F.C. players
Accrington Stanley F.C. players
Lancaster City F.C. players
Southport F.C. players
Barrow A.F.C. players
Witton Albion F.C. players
English Football League players
National League (English football) players